Divakarla Tirupati Sastry (born 26 March 1872) was a Telugu poet and scholar. He was one of the two poets known as Tirupati Venkata Kavulu and other being Chellapilla Venkata Sastry.

References 

Telugu people
Telugu poets
1872 births
1920 deaths
Indian male poets
19th-century Indian poets
20th-century Indian poets
19th-century Indian male writers
20th-century Indian male writers